Charles Williams is an Australian film director and screenwriter. He is best known for his 2018 film All These Creatures (2018), which won the Short Film Palme d'Or at the 2018 Cannes Film Festival.

The film went on to make its North American Premiere at the 2018 Toronto International Film Festival. and win more than 60 other international awards. including Australian Academy of Cinema and Television Arts Best Short Film.

Life and career

Williams grew up in country Victoria. At the age of 19 he made his first short film ‘I Can’t Get Started’ which won the Best Director award at Tropfest Film Festival. He went on to direct short films ‘The Cow Thief’ and ‘Home’ and most recently All These Creatures. which screened at over 180 international film festivals.

References

External links
 
 

Living people
Australian film directors
Australian screenwriters
Australian film producers
Year of birth missing (living people)